Ruislip-Northwood was a borough constituency represented in the House of Commons of the UK Parliament from 1950 to 2010 that elected one member (MP) by the first past the post system of election. It was centred on the districts of Ruislip and Northwood in the London Borough of Hillingdon.

The seat returned each of three Conservatives who stood in turn.  Its narrowest majority was 17.3% in 1997, over the Labour Party candidate.

History
This represented the northern half of the earlier Uxbridge constituency which was divided into two following house-building in the area in 1950.

Ruislip-Northwood was constituency that as such covered slightly elevated and gently hilly outskirts of West London, beginning  WNW of Charing Cross.

All three of its successive Members of Parliament were Old Etonians and as the majorities they received were non-marginal, with their contributions the seat was throughout its elections a safe seat.

Almost all of its area has been succeeded by Ruislip, Northwood and Pinner.

Boundaries
1950–1974: The Urban District of Ruislip-Northwood.

1974–1983: The London Borough of Hillingdon wards of Eastcote, Haydon, Manor, Northwood, Ruislip, and South Ruislip.

1983–1997: The London Borough of Hillingdon wards of Bourne, Cavendish, Deansfield, Eastcote, Manor, Northwood, Northwood Hills, Ruislip, and St Martins.

1997–2010: The London Borough of Hillingdon wards of Bourne, Cavendish, Deansfield, Eastcote, Harefield, Manor, Northwood, Northwood Hills, Ruislip, and St Martins.

The constituency consisted of the northern part of the London Borough of Hillingdon.

Members of Parliament

Elections

Elections in the 1950s

Elections in the 1960s

Elections in the 1970s

Elections in the 1980s

Elections in the 1990s

Elections in the 2000s

See also
List of parliamentary constituencies in London

Notes and references

Politics of the London Borough of Hillingdon
Constituencies of the Parliament of the United Kingdom established in 1950
Constituencies of the Parliament of the United Kingdom disestablished in 2010
Parliamentary constituencies in London (historic)